The 2011 European Para-Dressage Championship was held between September 1 to 4, 2011 in Moorsele, Belgium

Competitions

General 

Competition was held in eleven events; the team event involved four horse per nation, while individuals competed across ten graded individual freestyle competitions; the five individual classes, where marks also counted towards team medals, and the freestyle classes.

Competition was dominated by riders from Great Britain, historically the leading nation in the sport. Anne Dunham, Sophie Wells and Natasha Baker each won three gold medals on their way to taking team gold for Great Britain.

Medals

Medal table

External links 
 Official web page of the 2013 European Para Dressage Championship

References 

Dressage
Equestrian sports competitions in Belgium
International sports competitions hosted by Belgium
2011 in Belgian sport
Parasports competitions